The Oath of Salisbury refers to an event in August 1086 when William I of England summoned his tenants-in-chief and "landowning men of any account to William I, 'The Conqueror'" to Old Sarum where they swore allegiance to him and to be faithful against all other men. The oath was demanded at a time of crisis when 'The Conqueror' was facing revolt and invasion. There seems little doubt that it was intended as a practical assurance and reminder rather than as a constitutional statement.

References

1086 in England
Norman conquest of England
History of Salisbury